Abraham Aaron Rubashkin (1927 or 1928 – April 2, 2020) was a Russian-American businessman. He died during the COVID-19 pandemic due to complications brought on by COVID-19.

Early life 
An adherent of the Lubavitcher hasidic movement, Rubashkin was born in the late-1920s in the Russian town Nevel in the former Soviet Union He was the son of Getzel Rubashkin and Rosa Lubavicher Hasidim, who raised their two sons and daughters as observant Jews in spite of the anti-religious repression in the Soviet Union. When the Germans occupied Nevel in July 1941, the Rubashkin family fled east, eventually reaching the Uzbek city of Samarkand, where he married Rivka Chazanov of the Chein family of Nevel. After the war, the Rubashkin family left the Soviet Union via Lemberg and spent time in Austria, before they settled in Paris in 1947. In Paris, his father ran a grocery shop and his mother served as a cook at a Jewish girls school, and he became a butcher. In 1953, the family moved to New York City, where he and his partner opened Lieberman & Rubashkin Glatt Kosher Butchers on 14th Avenue in the Borough Park section of Brooklyn.

Career 
He was the head, usually referred to as "patriarch", of the Rubashkin family, dubbed a "kosher meat dynasty" by The New York Times. The Rubashkin family is a tight-knit family, well known among orthodox Jews in Brooklyn for its wealth and generosity towards Jewish causes. Rubashkin was the owner and president of most of the family's businesses, many of which have faced legal problems. Most notable of those problems were those of Agriprocessors, once the largest kosher slaughterhouse and meat-packaging factory in the United States. Through the company, Rubashkin was responsible for establishing a small Orthodox Jewish community in Postville, Iowa. Agriprocessors went into bankruptcy after the U.S. Immigration and Customs Enforcement (ICE) staged a raid of the plant known as the "Postville Raid" for employing illegal immigrant laborers.

Family businesses 
Although best known for his role in the kosher meat business, Rubashkin also invested in the textile industry and in real estate. Three generations, including in-laws, have been involved in the tight-knit family's business ventures.

Rubashkin's 
Rubashkin's, a butcher shop on 14th Avenue in the Borough Park section of Brooklyn, which Rubashkin opened in 1953 with his partner Alter Lieberman, was run by him until his death. His office on the second floor was said to be the center from where he was overseeing his various businesses. Rubashkin's was also one of the names under which the kosher meat produced by Agriprocessors' was marketed.

Crown Deli 
Crown Deli, on 13th Avenue in Brooklyn, a restaurant run by Rubashkin's wife, Rivka, since the 1960s, was described by some as more of a soup kitchen than a business. It was closed several times for sanitary violations by the New York City Department of Health and Mental Hygiene (DOHMH), the last time on March 3, 2010.

Cherry Hill Textiles 
Cherry Hill Textiles, Inc. was a corporation with its principal place of business in Brooklyn, New York. It engaged in the dyeing and finishing of textiles owned by Aaron Rubashkin and his second oldest son Moshe Rubashkin. In 1995 he and his son Moshe were found guilty of collecting union dues from their employees without sending the collected monies on to the "United Production Workers Union". They were ordered by the National Labor Relations Board. to repay the money with interest.

Agriprocessors 

Founded in 1987, the slaughterhouse and meat-packaging factory Agriprocessors, based in Postville, Iowa, was owned by Rubashkin and managed by two of his sons and a son-in-law. The distribution centers in Brooklyn and Miami, Florida were run by one of his daughters and another of his sons.

Agriprocessors faced several accusations of mistreatment of cattle between 2004 and 2008. The company was fined $600,000 for violating waste-water regulations in 2006, and $9.99 million in October 2008 for various violations of state labor law, including illegally deducting money from employees for safety equipment and failing to pay employees. When the U.S. Immigration and Customs Enforcement (ICE) staged a raid at the Postville plant in May 2008, during which nearly 400 illegal immigrant workers were arrested, Rubashkin said that he "had no idea that his workers were illegal". In September 2008, he, his son Sholom Rubashkin, as well as the company's human resources manager and two office employees, were charged for state child labor violations. He was never charged federally, and the state child labor charges against him were dropped in May 2010. His son was acquitted in state court of knowingly hiring underage workers at the plant in June 2010. However, Agriprocessors, as a corporation, entered a guilty plea to 83 child labor charges, with the footnote that the conviction wasn't based on the knowledge or intent of Sholom Rubashkin or his father, Abraham 'Aaron' Rubashkin. The plant's human resources manager pleaded to state child labor charges under an agreement with the state.

On November 5, 2008, Agriprocessors filed for Chapter 11 bankruptcy, and was bought at auction in July 2009.

Personal life 
Rubashkin's death from COVID-19 was announced on April 2, 2020.

Family 
The couple had nine children, five daughters and four sons:

Gutol Goldman
Sara Balkany
Rochel Leah Rosenfeld
Yossi Rubashkin
Moshe Rubashkin
Sholom Mordechai Rubashkin
Chayala Gourarie
Heshy Zvi Rubashkin
Chana Zelda Minkowicz

References

External links
 Elizabeth Dwoskin: "The Fall of the House of Rubashkin. As the nation's largest kosher empire implodes, Brooklyn's ultra-Orthodox Jews begin to break ranks". The Village Voice, December 3, 2008
 David Levine: "A Beef With the Rabbis". Portfolio.com, October 15, 2008
 National Labor Relations Board: "Cherry Hill Textiles, Inc. and United Production Workers Union, Local 17–18". Case 29–CA–17848. Decisions of the NLRB, August 17, 1995
 Jennie Rothenberg: "Torah Amid Corn". Hadassah magazine, April 2004. Retrieved from Shmais.com
 The Rubashkin Story from A-Z: Part 1 and Part 2. Yaakov Astor's Blog, May 12, 2010. Excerpt from "Rubashkin. The Entire Story", Zman magazine, June 2010
 "Lessons in Leadership". Forward 50 2008 . The Jewish Daily Forward

1920s births
2020 deaths
American food industry businesspeople
American manufacturing businesspeople
American Orthodox Jews
American people of Russian-Jewish descent
Businesspeople from New York City
Chabad-Lubavitch (Hasidic dynasty)
Child labor in the United States
Aaron
Soviet emigrants to the United States
Russian Jews
Businesspeople from Brooklyn
Russian businesspeople in the United States
American white-collar criminals
American businesspeople convicted of crimes
Businesspeople in the meat packing industry
Year of birth missing
Deaths from the COVID-19 pandemic in New York (state)